Remo D'Souza (born Ramesh Gopi Nair; 2 April 1974), is an Indian choreographer, actor, film director and producer, based in Mumbai. He is best known for his works in Yeh Jawaani Hai Deewani (2014) and Bajirao Mastani (2016). In a career span of more than 25 years, D'Souza has choreographed more than 100 films. He is one of the successful and renowned choreographers in the Bollywood industry and has been a role model to many Indian choreographers. He has also been a judge in the dance reality show Dance Plus for six consecutive seasons.

Personal life
D'Souza hails from Olavakkode, Palakkad, Kerala, born on April 2, 1974, in Bangalore into a Hindu family as Ramesh Gopi Nair to Gopi Nair, a chef in the Indian Air Force, and Madhaviyamma, a housewife. He has an elder brother, Ganesh, and four sisters. D'Souza completed his schooling at the Air Force School, Jamnagar, Gujarat. During his school days, he was an athlete and won prizes in the 100 meter race.

D'Souza studied in Jamnagar, Gujarat. He completed his 12th from there and during his HSC board exam, he realized that he didn't have any interest in studies. He immediately left school and went to Mumbai, but his father wanted him to join the Indian Air Force. Whatever he has learned about dance until now is on his own. He learned to dance by watching movies, music videos, etc. He would rather say Michael Jackson is his guru as he used to copy his steps watching his dance on the television and then choreograph his own steps by adding something extra.

D'Souza is married to Lizelle Watkins (now D'Souza), an Anglo-Indian from Mumbai and converted to Christianity, he then changed his name to Remo D'Souza. Lizelle is a costume designer who has designed costumes for many television shows. They have two sons, Dhruv and Gabriel. Currently D'Souza lives with his family, in Andheri West, Mumbai. She also works with him and helps him in various projects. 

On 11 December 2020, D'Souza suffered a heart attack and was admitted to the ICU of Kokilaben Hospital, Mumbai. Soon, he recovered and got discharged.

Career
D'Souza is a choreographer in Bollywood films and music videos. He has choreographed a number of films. Remo made his television debut with the dance reality show Dance India Dance (DID) along with choreographer Terence Lewis and Geeta Kapoor as judges and mentors. They trained 18 contestants in dance form of ballet, acrobatics, mid-air dancing, contemporary, Bollywood and hip-hop. He made his directorial debut with the comedy film F.A.L.T.U, which received a positive response from critics.

Remo's next directorial venture was the coming-of-age 3D dance-based film ABCD: Any Body Can Dance which starring Prabhu Deva, Dharmesh Yelande, Lauren Gottlieb, Salman Yusuff Khan and Punit Pathak. ABCD received positive reviews from critics and the film's soundtrack also received positive response from critics.

In 2015, Remo directed the second installment of the ABCD franchise, titled Disney's ABCD 2. It stars Varun Dhawan, Shraddha Kapoor, Prabhu Deva, Raghav Juyal, Lauren Gottlieb, Dharmesh Yelande and Punit Pathak, the film explores the career journey of Suresh and Vernon of the "fictitious dance crew" Kings United India, who went on to win the World Hip Hop Dance Championship in San Diego. The film received positive reviews from critics and the film's soundtrack also received a positive response from critics.

He was also the "super judge" on the prime time dance show Dance Plus on Star Plus, along with host Raghav Juyal and team captains Dharmesh Yelande, Shakti Mohan, and Punit Pathak.

In 2016, Remo directed A Flying Jatt, It was released on 24 August 2016, which starring Tiger Shroff, Jacqueline Fernandez, and Nathan Jones. The film tells the story of an ordinary man (Shroff) who gains superpowers. The film received mixed reviews from critics and Anupama Chopra from the Hindustan Times gave the film 1.5 stars out of 5 and said "The first half of A Flying Jatt has moments of fun – I loved that despite being a superhero he has a fear of heights, so he flies very close to the ground. But post-interval, laughter takes a back seat.

He then appeared as a judge on the reality show Dance Champions opposite Terence Lewis.

He also directed Race 3 the film featured Salman Khan, Anil Kapoor, Bobby Deol, Jacqueline Fernandez, Daisy Shah, Saqib Saleem and Freddy Daruwala. Race 3 was an internationally mounted saga of a family that deals in borderline crime. It was released on 15 June 2018 coinciding with Eid Though the movie received negative reviews, it was a box office success collecting over ₹178.98 crores in India and approximately ₹303 crores worldwide.

D'Souza judged  of Dance Plus along with host Raghav Juyal, Sugandha Mishra  and team captains Dharmesh Yelande, Shakti Mohan , Suresh Mukund , Karishma Chawan , and Punit Pathak. 

In 2020, Remo directed the third installment of ABCD Franchise titled ''Street Dancer 3D which retained some of original casts including Varun Dhawan, Shraddha Kapoor, Prabhu Deva, Raghav Juyal, Dharmesh Yelande, Punit Pathak and added Nora Fatehi , Salman Yusuff Khan and Vartika Jha. The film tells the story of two rival dance groups, despise each other and participate in a dance battle. Later, they decide to join hands for a greater cause. It was released on 24 January 2020 and received positive reviews from critics. The film has a worldwide gross collection of ₹102 crores and the film's soundtrack also received a positive response from critics.

Awards

Filmography

Choreography

Television

Music videos
Here are the music videos directed by Remo

References

External links

 

Indian choreographers
1974 births
Living people
Indian male dancers
Popping dancers
Dancers from Karnataka
Artists from Bangalore
Best Choreography National Film Award winners